is a former governor of Nagano Prefecture in Japan. After growing up in Matsumoto, Nagano, he graduated from the University of Tokyo in 1959 and entered the Ministry of International Trade and Industry upon graduation. In 1986 he was elected to the House of Representatives in the Diet (national legislature) for the first time. He served six consecutive terms as a member for Nagano No.4 district (1986–1996), Nagano No.2 district (1996–2003) and the national proportional representation block (2003–2005).

Whilst in the Diet he served in various ministerial roles, including as Minister of State for Food Safety, Minister of State for Disaster Management and Chairman of the National Public Safety Commission. In July 2005 he voted against the government's postal reform legislation and subsequently lost the support of the Liberal Democratic Party. He did not nominate to contest the September 2005 general election. In the following year he was elected governor of Nagano Prefecture and served one term.

References

External links 
  

Members of the House of Representatives (Japan)
Government ministers of Japan
Governors of Nagano
University of Tokyo alumni
1937 births
Living people
21st-century Japanese politicians
People from Matsumoto, Nagano